Chakrata is one of the seventy electoral Uttarakhand Legislative Assembly constituencies of Uttarakhand state in India. It includes Chakrata area of Dehradun District. This seat is previously known as Chakrata Constituency before 2002 Delimitation.

Chakrata Legislative Assembly constituency is a part of Tehri Garhwal (Lok Sabha constituency).

Members of Legislative Assembly

Election results

2022

See also
 Tehri Garhwal (Lok Sabha constituency)

References

External links
  
 http://eci.nic.in/eci_main/CurrentElections/CONSOLIDATED_ORDER%20_ECI%20.pdf
 http://ceo.uk.gov.in/files/Election2012/RESULTS_2012_Uttarakhand_State.pdf
 http://www.elections.in/uttarakhand/assembly-constituencies/chakrata.html

Politics of Dehradun
Assembly constituencies of Uttarakhand
2002 establishments in Uttarakhand
Constituencies established in 2002